The following is a timeline of the history of the city of Mountain View, California, USA.

Prior to 20th century

 The Ohlone tribe inhabited the area, the Tamyen (Tamien, Thamien) people are associated with the Mountain View area.
 1777 - Mission Santa Clara de Asís is founded on January 12, and the land that is now Mountain View was used as pasture for sheep and cattle by the Mission Indians.
 1842 - Mexico grants 8,800 acre land (part of what is now part of Mountain View and Sunnyvale) to Francisco Estrada and his wife, Inez Castro.
 1844 - Mexico grants 1,700 acre land grant of Rancho Posolmi, (the Moffett Field area) is granted to local Native American Lupe Ynigo.
 1845 - The Rancho Pastoria de las Borregas (Ranch of the Ewe/Lamb Pasture) was a transferred land grant to Mariano Castro, after the death of his relative Francisco M. Estrada.
 1852 - Stagecoach service begins, and the first stop (near Grant Road and El Camino Real) is formed for service between San Francisco and San Jose. A settlement is formed around this stop.
 1854
 Settlement named "Mountain View", naming is credited by local store keeper and the first postmaster, Jacob Shumway.
 Public school district opens.
 1867 - Rengstorff House (residence) built in Shoreline Park.  First Catholic mission of Saint Joseph built under Rev. Fr. Joseph Bixio at El Camino Real and Grant (currently the site of a BMW dealership).
 1888 - Mountain View Register newspaper begins publication.
 1893 - Stanford University professors "investigate" the Castro Indian Mound, also known as Indian Hill, Secondino Robles (in the neighborhood that is now known as Monta Loma) to better understand local Native American customs.

20th century

 1900 - Bank of Mountain View in business.
 1901 First Catholic pastor Rev. Fr. John J. Cullen assigned to Mountain View.
 1902
 November 7: Mountain View incorporated.
 November 7: Mountain View High School opens.
 "Electric streetlights, telephone service and a municipal water system" begin operating (approximate date).
 1904 - Seventh-day Adventist Pacific Press Publishing Association moves to town.
 1905
 Mountain View Public Library established.
 Farmers and Merchants Bank built.
 Mariano Castro family donates land for Saint Joseph Parish.  Concrete foundations poured at current location 582 Hope Street, at the corner of Castro Street.
 1906 - April 18: 1906 San Francisco earthquake.
 1909 - Town Hall built.
 1924 - The local high school is renamed to Mountain View Union High School and relocated to a larger campus, also serving the neighboring Los Altos and Whisman communities.
1926 - Ambra Olive Oil Company of Mountain View is opened on 987 North Rengstorff Avenue. Founded by Mario Ambra (1887–1968), a native of Pachino, Italy, and his wife Rosaria (1890–1981).
 1928 - Saint Joseph Catholic Church burned down by arsonist.
 1929 - Saint Joseph Catholic Church rebuilt. Murray Harris pipe organ, with pipes cast before the Great Earthquake of 1906 was donated by Saint Ignatius Church in San Francisco.
 1930 - Mountain View Theater opens.
 1933 - US Naval Air Station, Moffet Field established.
 1934
 Historic Adobe Building constructed.
 Mountain View Buddhist Temple active.
 1940: the city became the home of the National Advisory Committee for Aeronautics (now the NASA Ames Research Center), influencing the city's development of its aerospace and electronics industries. 
 1948 - Construction of Saint Joseph Catholic School on Miramonte Avenue under Rev. Fr. James Doyle.
 1950
 Monte Vista Drive-In cinema in business.
 Population: 6,563.
 1954 - Mountain View Historical Association formed.
 1955 
February 24: Birth of Steve Jobs.
Mountain View Recreation Commission decided to name McKelvey Park, after John Addison McKelvey of the Mountain View Berry Farm.
 1956 - Beckman Instruments' Shockley Semiconductor Laboratory active.
 1957 - The construction of San Antonio Shopping Center begins.
 1959 - The Jobs family, including young Steve Jobs move to the Monta Loma neighborhood living at 286 Diablo Avenue. 
1960 - Population: 30,889.
 1964 - Moffett Drive-In Theatre opened
 1966 - Mayfield Mall opens (corner of Central Expressway and San Antonio Road)
1967 - The Jobs family, including young Steve Jobs, move away from Mountain View to nearby Cupertino.
 1968 - Intel Corporation and Monolithic Memories in business.
 1970 - Regional Metropolitan Transportation Commission established.
 1972 - Judith Moss became Mountain View's first female councilmember.
 1975 - Old Mill Shopping Mall (shopping centre) in business.
 1979 - Kannon Do Zen Meditation Center building is founded.
 1981 - Mountain View Union High School closes, to be relocated and renamed.
 1982 - Grid Compass laptop computer introduced.
 1983 
 The Meadowlands garbage facility is closed, in order to restore wetlands
 Mayfield Mall closes (corner of Central Expressway and San Antonio Road)
 1985
 Actel Corporation and Century Cinema in business.
 Moffett Drive-In Theatre closed and demolished
 1986 - Former Mayfield Mall location is converted into Hewlett Packard offices.
 1987 - Downtown Mountain View Station opens.
 1989 
 the Old Mill Shopping Mall closes
 Stanford University surrenders the collected artifacts and remains from the Castro Shell Mound (the area is now known as the Monte Loma neighborhood) to the descendants, this includes 550 Ohlone Indian remains.
 1991
The Rengstorff House is fully restored
Marv Owen, a baseball player for the Detroit Tigers (1931–37), Chicago White Sox (1938-39) and Boston Red Sox (1940), died at age 85 at a nursing home in Mountain View.
 1993
 The Peninsula Times-Tribune newspaper closes, paper served 10 local communities including Mountain View
 Voice of Mountain View newspaper begins publication.
 Anna Eshoo  becomes U.S. representative for California's 14th congressional district.
 1994 - Santa Clara County government computer network begins operating.
 1996 - The Computer Museum (now called the Computer History Museum) moves part of the unused museum collection from Boston, Massachusetts to Mountain View and it's stored in a former Moffett Field building.
 1995 - The Crossings, a housing community is built over the Old Mill Shopping Mall
 1997 - City website online (approximate date).
 1999 
 The Computer Museum moves the remainder of the museum collection to Mountain View and renamed to The Computer Museum History Center.
 Google Inc. in business.

21st century

 2000 - Rosemary Stasek becomes mayor
 2001 - Mario Ambra becomes mayor
 2002  
Computer History Museum opens at 1401 N. Shoreline Blvd.
 Sally Lieber becomes mayor.
 In April, Mario Ambra resigns from City Council after being found guilty for misconduct.
 2003 - Mike Kasperzak becomes mayor 
 2004 - Matt Pear becomes mayor
 2005 
 Matt Neely becomes mayor
 The old pump windmill is relocated to the Rengstorff House, formerly located at Mountain View Grant Road Farm.
 2006 
 Nick Galiotto becomes mayor
 The Jehning Lock Museum opens at 175 Castro Street, featuring one of the largest collections of locks and keys. 
 2007 - Laura Macias becomes the city's second Mexican-American woman to be mayor 
 2008 - Tom Means becomes mayor
 2009 
 Margaret Abe-Koga becomes Mountain View's first female Asian-American mayor
 2010
 Population: 74,066.
 Ronit Bryant becomes mayor
 2011 
 Jac Siegel becomes mayor
 Dan Rich becomes city manager
 The Computer History Museum reopens, after a two-year, $19 million remodel.
 2012
 Mike Kasperzak becomes mayor
 2013  
 John Inks becomes mayor
 Google leases the former Mayfield Mall location (corner of Central Expressway and San Antonio Road)
 2014 
 Chris Clark becomes mayor.
 2015
 John McAlister becomes mayor.
 2016
 Patricia "Pat" Showalter becomes mayor.
 Rent control approved.
 November 13: Mountain View High School received national attention after placing History teacher Frank Navarro on administrative leave for allegedly drawing historical comparisons between Donald Trump and Adolf Hitler.
 2017
 Ken Rosenberg becomes mayor
 Rental Housing Committee appointed
 2018
 Lenny Siegel becomes mayor
 2019
 Lisa Matichak becomes mayor
 2020
 Margaret Abe-Koga becomes mayor
 2021
 Ellen Kamei becomes mayor
 2022
 Lucas Ramirez becomes mayor
 2023
 Alison Hicks becomes mayor

See also
 History of Santa Clara County, California
 Timeline of the San Francisco Bay Area
 History of Google, headquartered in city
 Timelines of other cities in the Northern California area of California: Fresno, Oakland, Sacramento, San Francisco, San Jose

References

Bibliography

External links

 
 Items related to Mountain View, various dates (via Digital Public Library of America).

Mountain View, California
San Francisco Bay Area-related lists
History of the San Francisco Bay Area
mountain